Statistics of the Brunei Premier League for the 2004 season.

Overview
It was contested by 10 teams, and DPMM FC won the championship.

League standings

References
Brunei 2004 (RSSSF)

Brunei Premier League seasons
Brunei
Brunei
1